Emilio Rodríguez Zapico (27 May 1944 – 6 August 1996) was a Spanish racing driver. He entered one Formula One Grand Prix, the 1976 Spanish Grand Prix, with the then-struggling Williams team, but failed to qualify. The Williams FW04 that Zapico used was already a year old, and it was later used by Brian McGuire.

He later returned to Touring Cars in the 1980s before retiring. Zapico was killed in an aircraft accident, piloting his ultralight in Huete, Spain, on 6 August 1996.

Racing record

Complete British Saloon Car Championship results
(key) (Races in bold indicate pole position; races in italics indicate fastest lap.)

Complete Formula One results
(key)

References

Spanish racing drivers
Spanish Formula One drivers
1944 births
1996 deaths